The Order of the Auspicious Stars was the second highest order of chivalry of the Korean Empire. It was established in 1900 with other orders by Emperor Gojong, as part of reforms of the Korean Empire.

History 
1902, Gojong of Korea introduced the order of the auspicious stars as the lower class order than Order of the Golden Ruler. It was not the part of the establishments in 1900. Order of the Auspicious Stars did not have any classes. There were 13 recipients of Order of the Auspicious Stars from 1907 to 1910.

Form 

Order of the Auspicious Stars was specified into two types. First was Grand Cordon and second was medal. Perimeter of Grand Cordon was 7.5 centimeters. In the red central circle surrounded by white lines, silver-white stars are arranged in three directions. Cucumber leaves surround the central circle in a circle, and then silver-white rays are arranged in a cross shape, and three white oyster flowers are arranged in each space in between. The Medal was just the same as the Grand Cordon but, the perimeter was 6 centimeters.

Grand Cordon included Daesu which was wore from the left to the right and medal was wore in the left breast.

Recipients 

 Hasegawa Yoshimichi on 12 March 1907
 Terauchi Masatake on 29 June 1907
 Yi Jun-yong on 23 September 1908
 Iwakura Tomosada on 2 April 1910

Notes

References 

Orders of chivalry
Awards established in 1902
1902 establishments in Korea
Orders, decorations, and medals of the Korean Empire